Bilthoven is a railway station located in Bilthoven, Netherlands. The station is located on the Utrecht–Kampen railway between Utrecht and Amersfoort, and was opened on 20 August 1863. The current island platform was opened in 1907. The station was previously called De  (1863–1918).

Train services
The following services call at Bilthoven:

Bus services

References

External links
NS website 
Dutch Public Transport journey planner 

Railway stations opened in 1863
Railway stations in Utrecht (province)
Railway stations on the Centraalspoorweg
De Bilt
1863 establishments in the Netherlands
Railway stations in the Netherlands opened in the 19th century